The Continental Hockey League is a defunct  semi-professional ice hockey league which operated from 1972 to 1986. It is known as the predecessor to the All-American Hockey League, in which three teams (Danville Dashers, Dayton Jets, and Troy Sabres) were charter members.

The league ceased operations after the 1985–86 season.

CnHL Teams
 Billings Marlboros (1985–86)
 Chicago Cardinals (1972–76, 1978–86) 
 Chicago Wildcats (1973–75)
 Danville Dashers (1981–86)
 Decatur Blues (1981–83)
 Dayton Jets (1985–86)
 Decatur Storm (1983–84)
 Findlay Warriors (1983–84), became Dayton Jets
 Fort Wayne Scouts (1978–79)
 Fox Valley Flyers (1979–80)
 Grand Rapids Grizzlies (1980–82)
 Hammond Cardinals (1977–78)
 Janesville Jets (1981–82)
 Kenosha Chargers (1979–81)
 Kenosha Flyers (1974–75, 1976–79)
 Lake County Flyers (1975–76)
 Madison Blues (1974–77)
 Minot Maple Leafs (1985–86)
 Pekin Stars (1972–73, 1977–79)
 Peoria Blades (1972–82)
 Rockton Wheels (1977–78)
 Rock River Jets (1982–83)
 St. Louis Pepsi (1972–73)
 St. Louis Rockets (1972–73)
 St. Louis Chiefs (1973–74)
 St. Louis Saints (1974–76)
 Spirit of St Louis (1973–74)
 Springfield Kings (1976–85)
 Troy Sabres (1982–86)
 Webster Stars (1972–73)

References

Defunct ice hockey leagues in the United States